Miss Grand Nepal 2018 was the second edition of the Miss Grand Nepal beauty pageant, held on August 4, 2018, at the Hotel Gurkha Heritage in Kathmandu. Ten contestants, who qualified through the audions held countrywide, competed for the title, of whom a 26-year-old media personality from Kathmandu, Urussa Joshi, was named the winner, and received रु50,000 rupee cash and a Suzuki scooter as the prize, while the first and the second runners-up, Eksha Maden of Dhangadhi and Riya Gaihre of Lalitpur, obtained cash of रु30,000 and रु20,000 rupee, respectively. Urussa Joshi then represented Nepal at Miss Grand International 2018 held later that year on October 25 in Myanmar, but she got a non-placement.

The event was showcased under the direction of the RK Entertainment Group.

Background
After the RK Entertainment Group took over the competition license of the Miss Grand Nepal beauty pageant from Looks Entertainment in late 2017, the organization announced the launch of the 2018 edition in mid-2018, with the first phase auditions happening in Kathmandu, Pokhara, Nawalparasi, and Dharan, and then all qualified candidates were finalized to ten in the final audition round in Kathmandu. The whole process of the audition was conducted from May 12 to June 9. A press conference was held on May 10, 2018, at the Royal Empire Hotel in Kathmandu, wherein the organizer revealed the details related to the contest.

The auditions started on May 12 in Pokhara, then moved to Chitwan on May 14, to Butwal on May 16, and then to Dharan on May 18, while an online application was given a June 8 deadline. All qualified candidates were additionally narrowed to ten in the final audition held on June 9 in Kathmandu, and the national final is scheduled for August 4, at the Hotel Gurkha Heritage.

Result

Color keys

Sub-Titles

Contestants
10 contestants competed for the title of Miss Grand Nepal 2018.

References

External links

 

Miss Grand Nepal
Grand Nepal